Michael Ashley Mann KCVO (25 May 1924 – 31 December 2011) was an Anglican bishop during the last quarter of the 20th century.

Early life
He was born on 25 May 1924 in Harrow, London, England. He was educated at Harrow School, an all-boys public school in London, where was a member of the shooting team.

Mann attended a wartime short course at the Royal Military College, Sandhurst. Then, 1943 to 1946, he served as an officer in the 1st King's Dragoon Guards, an armoured car regiment of the British Army. He began his active service in North Africa equipped with the Humber Armoured Car. Then, in September 1943, he was involved in the Salerno landings of Operation Avalanche. As a troop leader, he advanced north through Italy to Monte Cassino, where the armoured cars became stuck in the boggy ground and the regiment resorted to mules and even formed an operational horse troop. His troop were then posted to Florence to support the local Italian partisans maintain order in the city, and Mann took over a bar on the Piazza della Repubblica as a base for himself and his troops.

From 1946 to 1955, he served in the Colonial Service in Nigeria.

Ordained ministry
Ordained in 1957 he was later Vicar of Sparkwell, a Canon Residentiary at Norwich Cathedral, Bishop of Dudley and finally Dean of Windsor. He retired in 1989.

Personal life
In 1990, the year after his retirement, his first wife died. In 1991, he married the widow of George Pepys, Bishop of Buckingham from 1964 to 1974.

He died on 31 December 2011.

References
 

1924 births
People educated at Harrow School
Graduates of the Royal Military College, Sandhurst
Bishops of Dudley
20th-century Church of England bishops
Knights Commander of the Royal Victorian Order
Deans of Windsor
2011 deaths
Honorary Chaplains to the Queen